Fotheringay 2 is the second album by the group formed by Sandy Denny after she left Fairport Convention in 1969. The band was short-lived, and broke up in 1971 after only a small number of tracks for this album had been completed, some of which then subsequently appeared on other compilations. The remainder were assembled (posthumously in the cases of Denny and Trevor Lucas), with additional studio recording as needed, from masters in various states of completeness by Jerry Donahue and finally released in 2008. Two songs originally worked on for this album (John the Gun and Late November) were re-recorded and appeared on the first solo Denny album The North Star Grassman and the Ravens in 1971, while live versions of others had previously been known to collectors from recordings of BBC radio broadcasts and live concerts, as subsequently compiled on the 2015 release Nothing More: The Collected Fotheringay.

Track listing
All tracks credited to Trad. arr. Fotheringay except where noted.
 "John the Gun" (Sandy Denny) – 5.07
 "Eppie Moray" – 4.45
 "Wild Mountain Thyme" – 3.51
 "Knights of the Road" (Trevor Lucas, Pete Roach) – 4.10
 "Late November" (Sandy Denny) – 4.40
 "Restless" (Trevor Lucas, Pete Roach) – 2.48
 "Gypsy Davey" – 3.42
 "I Don't Believe You" (Bob Dylan) – 4.45
 "Silver Threads and Golden Needles" (Dick Reynolds, Jack Rhodes) – 4.30
 "Bold Jack Donahue" – 7.38
 "Two Weeks Last Summer" (Dave Cousins) – 3.51

Personnel
Fotheringay
Sandy Denny – guitar, piano, vocals
Trevor Lucas – guitar, vocals
Jerry Donahue – guitar, vocals
Pat Donaldson – bass, vocals
Gerry Conway – drums
with:
Sam Donahue – saxophone
Wendy Righart Van Gelder  – backing vocals
John "Rabbit" Bundrick – organ

Production
Producer: Jerry Donahue
Engineers: John Wood, Jerry Boys, Scott Whitley, Henno Althoff, Justin Fox, Richard Barron, Jerry Donahue
Mastering: Ben Wiseman
Art direction: David Suff, Phil Smee
Photography: n/a
Liner notes: Richard Williams

References

External links
http://dmme.net/specials/foth.html – Jerry Donahue diaries

2008 albums
Sandy Denny albums
Island Records albums
Albums produced by Joe Boyd